is a Japanese novel written by Sachiko Kashiwaba. It was initially serialized in the Iwate Nippo daily newspaper from May 10, 2014, to July 4, 2015. Kodansha later published the novel in print with cover art by Yukiko Saito on September 11, 2015. An anime film adaptation by David Production premiered in Japan on August 27, 2021. The anime is part of the "Zutto Ōen Project 2011 + 10...", commemorating the 10th anniversary of the 2011 Tōhoku earthquake and tsunami.

Characters

Media

Book

Film 
An anime film adaptation was announced on November 5, 2020. David Production produces the film, with direction by Shinya Kawatsura, screenplay written by Reiko Yoshida and music composed by Yuri Miyauchi. The film was released on August 27, 2021, receiving the Best Animation Film Award at the Mainichi Film Festival.

Eleven Arts announced at their panel at the A-Kon event on June 4, 2022 that they has licensed the film and will bring both an original Japanese version and a new English dub for the North American theatrical release in partnership with AX Cinema Nights on September 7.

Notes

Reception
The novel won the 54th Noma Children's Literature Award in 2016.

References

External links
  
 

2014 Japanese novels
2015 Japanese novels
2021 anime films
Aniplex
David Production
Japanese novels adapted into films
Japanese serial novels
Kodansha books